Kavitark Ram Shriram (born 1956/57) is an Indian-American billionaire businessman and philanthropist. He is a founding board member and one of the first investors in Google. He worked earlier in Amazon. Shriram came to Amazon.com in August 1998, when the company acquired Junglee, an online comparison shopping firm of which Shriram was president. Before Junglee and Amazon, Shriram was a member of the Netscape executive team, joining them in 1994, before they shipped products or posted revenue.

According to Forbes, as of September 2020, his net worth was $2.3 billion.

Early life 
Shriram holds a bachelor's degree in mathematics from Loyola College, Chennai of the University of Madras.

Career 
Shriram started his career with Bell-Northern Research.

In 1994, he became a vice president of Netscape. Later, he also served as a president of Junglee.

Shriram started Sherpalo, a venture capital firm that invests in promising new disruptive technologies, in January 2000.

In 2020, Ram Shriram was selected for the Ellis Island medal of honor.

Philanthropy 
Shriram and his wife have donated funds through education-focused Dhanam Foundation. They have funded Shriram Family Professorship in Science Education and the Shriram Family Fellowship in Science Education at Stanford Graduate School of Education. They have also funded $57 million to establish Shriram Center for Bioengineering & Chemical Engineering at Stanford University.

In 2014, the Shriram along with his wife donated $61 million to the newly established Stanford School of Bioengineering.

Personal life 
He is married to Vijay Shriram. They have two daughters, Jhanvi and Ketaki, graduates of Stanford University and founders of Palo Alto-based AI startup Krikey.

References 

Living people
1950s births
American computer businesspeople
Indian emigrants to the United States
Stanford University trustees
Amazon (company) people
American billionaires
American Hindus
American philanthropists
Tamil billionaires
American corporate directors
Businesspeople from Chennai
University of Madras alumni
American people of Indian descent
Tamil entrepreneurs
Indian Tamil people
Directors of Alphabet Inc.